The 1970 IAAF World Race Walking Cup was held in Eschborn, Federal Republic of Germany, on October 10, 1970.  The event was also known as Lugano Trophy.

Complete results were published.

Medallists

Results

Men's 20 km

Men's 50 km

Team
The team rankings, named Lugano Trophy, combined the 20km and 50km events team results.

Participation
The participation of 60 athletes from 8 countries is reported.

 (8)
 (6)
 (8)
 (6)
 (8)
 (8)
 (8)
 (8)

Qualifying rounds 
From 1961 to 1985 there were qualifying rounds with the first two winners proceeding to the final.  This year, the German Democratic Republic, the United Kingdom, India, the United States, and the Soviet Union proceeded directly to the final.

Zone 1
Odense, Denmark, August 15/16

Zone 2
Dunaújváros, Hungary, August 26/27

References

World Athletics Race Walking Team Championships
World Race Walking Cup
World Race Walking Cup
International athletics competitions hosted by West Germany